Akwamufie is the ceremonial state and seat capital of the Akwamu people. It is located along the Akuapim-Togo range, the Volta River and in the Eastern Region. It is the town where the Paramount Chief, Odeneho Kwafo-Akoto III and Queen Nana Afrakoma II reside and administer their operations. The majority of the divisional chiefs and sub chiefs also reside in Akwamufie. Akwamu State or Kingdom consists of thirty six towns of which Akwamufie is the capital.

See also
 Akan people
 List of rulers of the Akan state of Akuapem Guan

References

External links
 https://web.archive.org/web/20141216194007/http://akwamuman.org/

Populated places in the Eastern Region (Ghana)